The 1996 Hungarian Grand Prix (formally the XII Marlboro Magyar Nagydíj) was a Formula One motor race held at the Hungaroring, Mogyoród, Pest, Hungary on 11 August 1996. It was the twelfth race of the 1996 Formula One World Championship and the eleventh Hungarian Grand Prix.

The 77-lap race was won by Canadian driver Jacques Villeneuve, driving a Williams-Renault, after starting from third position. Villeneuve's teammate and Drivers' Championship leader, Briton Damon Hill, finished second, with Frenchman Jean Alesi third in a Benetton-Renault. This was Williams' fifth 1–2 finish of the season, and it secured their fourth Constructors' Championship in five years.

Classification

Qualifying

Race

Championship standings after the race
Bold text indicates the World Champions.

Drivers' Championship standings

Constructors' Championship standings

References

Hungarian Grand Prix
Hungarian Grand Prix
Grand Prix
Hungarian Grand Prix